"We've Saved the Best for Last" is a song by  American saxophonist Kenny G featuring American singer Smokey Robinson, from his fifth studio album Silhouette. The song was released in 1989 as Kenny G's third single from the album. The song reached number 4 on US adult contemporary, number 47 on US Billboard Hot 100 and number 18 on US R&B chart.

Background
The song is the second-most successful single from the album, after Silhouette reached number 13 on Billboard Hot 100 in 1988.

Music video
A music video for the song was released in 1989, it features both Kenny G and Smokey Robinson as the performers, as G, Robinson, and their crew was preparing for the show, and when on stage.

Track listing

Charts

References

External links
 Kenny G's official Website

1989 singles
Instrumentals
Kenny G songs
Song recordings produced by Walter Afanasieff
1988 songs
Arista Records singles